"Shining Star" is a  song by Earth, Wind & Fire issued as a single in January 1975 on Columbia Records. The song rose to No. 1 on both the Billboard Hot 100 chart and the Billboard Hot Soul Songs chart, becoming their first single to top both charts (and only single to top the former). It has also been certified Gold in the US by the RIAA.

Overview
"Shining Star" was produced by Maurice White and composed by White, Larry Dunn and Philip Bailey. 
The song also came off EWF's 1975 album That's the Way of the World.

The concept for the song came to Maurice White while strolling at night during the band's recording of That's the Way of the World at Caribou Ranch. He became inspired by looking up at the starry sky and took his ideas about the song to the other band members.

Critical reception
Vibe called Shining Star a "treasure". Alex Henderson of Allmusic described the song as "sweaty funk". Gordon Fletcher of Rolling Stone wrote that the song "glow(s) with an incendiary charge that once moved record producer Sandy Pearlman to term EW&F 'the closest thing to a black heavy-metal band'." Daryl Easlea of the BBC found that "Shining Star can be seen as much an influence on Prince as anything by James Brown". Stephen Curwood of The Boston Globe noted that the tune "shows off the fabulous range and coordination of this nine-man vocal ensemble and instrumental choir.

"Shining Star" also won a Grammy for Best R&B Performance by a Duo or Group with Vocals.

Personnel 

 Maurice White – lead and backing vocals
 Phillip Bailey – lead and backing vocals, congas
 Verdine White – bass, backing vocals
 Ralph Johnson – percussion, drums
 Al McKay – lead guitar
 Johnny Graham – rhythm guitar
 Fred White – drums
 Larry Dunn – clavinet, 
 Andrew P. Woolfolk – soprano saxophone, tenor saxophone
 George Bohanon – trombone
 Oscar Brashear – trumpet
 Ernie Watts – additional saxophone

Chart positions

Certifications

Accolades
The information regarding accolades attributed to "Shining Star" is adapted from AcclaimedMusic.net

(*) designates lists that are unordered.

References

1975 singles
Earth, Wind & Fire songs
Billboard Hot 100 number-one singles
Cashbox number-one singles
Funk songs
Stryper songs
Songs written by Larry Dunn
1974 songs
Columbia Records singles
Songs written by Philip Bailey
Songs written by Maurice White
1990 singles
Song recordings produced by Maurice White